The 2018 season of the 4. divisjon, the fifth highest association football league for men in Norway.

Between 22 and 26 games (depending on group size) are played in 24 groups, with 3 points given for wins and 1 for draws.

Teams 

Group 1
Sarpsborg 08 2 − promoted
Sprint-Jeløy
Fredrikstad 2
Råde
Borgen
Rakkestad
Sparta Sarpsborg
Kråkerøy 2
Ås
Idd
Sarpsborg
Borgar − relegated
Tistedalen − relegated
Askim − relegated

Group 2
Årvoll − promoted
Kjelsås 2
Lommedalen
Heggedal
Christiania
Skeid 2
Asker 2
Holmen
Vollen
Hasle-Løren
Frigg 2 − relegated
Røa − pulled team

Group 3
Nordstrand − promoted
Manglerud Star
Heming
Oslojuvelene
Fagerborg
Lyn 2
Ullern 2
Bærum 2
Furuset
Majorstuen
Romsås − relegated
Øvrevoll Hosle − relegated

Group 4
Rommen − promoted
Kolbotn
Holmlia
Grorud 2
Oppsal 2
Nesodden
Vestli
Ski
Follo 2
Fremad Famagusta
Oslo City
Fortuna Oslo − relegated

Group 5
Ull/Kisa 2 – promoted
Fu/Vo
Aurskog-Høland
Kløfta
Blaker
Rælingen
Eidsvold
Strømmen 2
Sørumsand
Eidsvold Turn 2
Raumnes & Årnes
Fet
Hauerseter − relegated
Skedsmo 2 − relegated

Group 6
Raufoss 2 – promoted
Gran
Toten
Kolbukameratene
Storhamar
Redalen
MBK Domkirkeodden
Brumunddal 2
Moelven
Gjøvik-Lyn 2
Søndre Land – relegated
Nordre Land – relegated

Group 7
Kongsvinger 2 – promoted
Lillehammer
Ham-Kam 2
Sander
Faaberg
Trysil
Furnes
Engerdal
Flisa
Eidskog
Follebu
Ridabu

Group 8
Mjøndalen 2 – promoted
Modum
Drammens BK
Jevnaker
Kongsberg
Hallingdal
Konnerud
Åssiden 2 – relegated
Svelvik
Solberg
Holeværingen
Steinberg
Huringen
Slemmestad – relegated

Group 9
Flint – promoted
Eik Tønsberg
Teie
FK Tønsberg 2
Runar
Re
Ørn-Horten 2
Larvik Turn
Husøy & Foynland
Falk/Borre (without Falk in 2019)
Tønsberg FK − relegated
Fram 2 - pulled team
Nanset - pulled team

Group 10
Storm – promoted
Odd 3
Hei
Skarphedin
Tollnes
Notodden 2
Pors 2
Stathelle og Omegn
Herkules
Ulefoss (cooperation team with Skade in 2019)
Skade (cooperation team with Ulefoss in 2019)
Kjapp/Gvarv – pulled team

Group 11
Mandalskameratene – promoted
Lyngdal
Våg
Fløy 2
Flekkefjord
Vigør
Express
Jerv 2
Søgne
Arendal 2
Randesund
Kvinesdal
Vindbjart 2 – relegated
Donn 2 – relegated

Group 12
Bryne 2 – promoted
Varhaug
Riska
Eiger
Frøyland
Ålgård
Midtbygden
Klepp
Lura
Vaulen
Nærbø
Sola 2
Bogafjell – relegated
Moi – relegated

Group 13
Djerv 1919 – promoted
Åkra
Haugesund 2
Hinna
Sandnes Ulf 2
Voll
Kopervik
Vidar 2
Skjold
Randaberg
Hana
Hundvåg
Rosseland – relegated
Vedavåg Karmøy – relegated

Group 14
Os – promoted
Lyngbø
Sandviken
Frøya
Fyllingsdalen 2
Loddefjord
Sund
Vestsiden-Askøy
NHH
Valestrand Hjellvik – relegated
Austevoll – relegated
Telavåg – relegated

Group 15
Bergen Nord – promoted
Arna-Bjørnar
Åsane 2
Gneist
Trio
Trott
Bjarg
Solid
Odda – relegated
Ny-Krohnborg – relegated
Fana 2 – relegated
Nordhordland – relegated

Group 16
Fjøra − promoted
Eid
Stryn
Studentspretten
Kaupanger
Årdal
Florø 2
Dale
Tornado Måløy
Bremanger
Vik − relegated
Skavøypoll − relegated

Group 17
Aalesund 2 − promoted
Bergsøy
Emblem
Volda
Rollon
SIF/Hessa
Ørsta
Valder
Larsnes/Gursken
Hareid
Sykkylven − relegated
Godøy − relegated

Group 18
Sunndal − promoted
Eide og Omegn
Tomrefjord
Surnadal
Åndalsnes
Averøykameratene
Kristiansund FK
Vestnes Varfjell
Midsund
Malmefjorden/Ekko/Aureosen (without Ekko in 2019)
Elnesvågen og Omegn
Træff 2 − relegated

Group 19
Ranheim 2 − promoted
Trygg/Lade
Namsos
Rørvik
Heimdal
Byåsen 2
Sverresborg
Stjørdals-Blink 2
Vuku
Ørland
Neset − relegated
Vestbyen − relegated

Group 20
Strindheim − promoted
NTNUI
Orkla 2
Kvik
Nardo 2
Hitra
Charlottenlund
Meldal
KIL/Hemne
Røros
Tydal − relegated
Støren − relegated

Group 21
Bodø/Glimt 2 − promoted
Mosjøen
Mo − merged with Stålkameratene post-season
Fauske/Sprint
Sandnessjøen
Brønnøysund
Innstranden
Grand Bodø
Åga

Group 22
Leknes − promoted
Morild
Skånland
Medkila
Landsås
Mjølner 2 − discontinued
Lofoten
Svolvær
Ballstad
Stålbrott/Sortland 2 − relegated
Grovfjord/Harstad 2 − split post-season
Andenes

Group 23
Tromsø 2 − promoted
Krokelvdalen
Tromsdalen 2
Finnsnes 2
Nordkjosbotn
Bardufoss og Omegn
Lyngen/Karnes
Salangen
Stakkevollan
Storelva
Ishavsbyen
Nordreisa − relegated

Group 24
Norild − promoted
Porsanger
Kirkenes
Tverrelvdalen
Alta 2
HIF/Stein
Sørøy Glimt
Bossekop
Nordlys
Honningsvåg
Indrefjord
Kautokeino − relegated

References
NIFS

5
Norway
Norway
Norwegian Fourth Division seasons